Liu Menggeng (1881–after 1937) was a politician and physician of the Republic of China and Manchukuo. He was born in Qinhuangdao, Hebei.

Background and disappearance
Menggeng was the 8th Republican mayor of Beijing. He was affiliated with the Zhili clique, which was part of the Beiyang government. After the creation of Manchukuo, he accepted a Japanese offer to be the collaborationist governor of Rehe Province. His whereabouts after leaving office are unknown.

See also 
 List of people who disappeared

References

Bibliography
 
 
新発現並基本確認的河北区名人旧居居（三） 天津市河北区政務網（天津市河北区人民政府ホームページ）

1881 births
1930s missing person cases
20th-century Chinese physicians
20th-century deaths
Chinese collaborators with Imperial Japan
Mayors of Beijing
Members of the Zhili clique
Missing person cases in China
People of Manchukuo
Politicians from Qinhuangdao
Physicians from Hebei
Republic of China politicians from Hebei
Year of death unknown